This is a partial list of caves in the Peak District of England, arranged alphabetically. Most lie within the Peak District National Park.

Some of the caves are protected Scheduled Monuments and are marked with * in the table below.

See also 

 List of caves in the United Kingdom
 Scheduled monuments in Derbyshire
Scheduled monuments in Staffordshire

References 

Peak District